Shri Shankaracharya Institute of Medical Sciences is a private medical school located in Bhilai, Chhattisgarh, India. It is affiliated with Pt. Deendayal Upadhyay Memorial Health Sciences and Ayush University of Chhattisgarh, Raipur.

References

External links
http://ssimsb.ac.in/

Medical colleges in Chhattisgarh
Colleges affiliated to Pt. Deendayal Upadhyay Memorial Health Sciences and Ayush University of Chhattisgarh
2018 establishments in Chhattisgarh
Educational institutions established in 2018